Thor Gystad (born 3 August 1919 in Ullensaker, died 15 June 2007) was a Norwegian politician for the Labour Party.

He was elected to the Norwegian Parliament from Akershus in 1969, and was re-elected on two occasions.

On the local level he was a member of Ullensaker city council from 1951 to 1971 and 1979 to 1983, serving as mayor from 1959 to 1969. From 1959 to 1969 he was also a member of Akershus county council, serving as county mayor from 1963 to 1969.

References

1919 births
2007 deaths
Members of the Storting
Labour Party (Norway) politicians
Mayors of places in Akershus
Chairmen of County Councils of Norway
People from Ullensaker
20th-century Norwegian politicians